This is a list of Belgian television related events from 2015.

Events
15 May - 22-year-old pole dancer Domenico Vaccaro wins the third season of Belgium's Got Talent.

Debuts

Television shows

1990s
Samson en Gert (1990–present)
Familie (1991–present)
Thuis (1995–present)

2000s
Mega Mindy (2006–present)

2010s
ROX (2011–present)
The Voice van Vlaanderen (2011–present)
Belgium's Got Talent (2012–present)

Ending this year

Births

Deaths

See also
2015 in Belgium